German submarine U-853 was a Type IXC/40 U-boat of Nazi Germany's Kriegsmarine during World War II. Her keel was laid down on 21 August 1942 by DeSchiMAG AG Weser of Bremen. She was commissioned on 25 June 1943 with Kapitänleutnant Helmut Sommer in command. U-853 saw action during the Battle of the Atlantic in World War II. She conducted three patrols, sinking two ships totalling  and 430 tons.

On her final patrol, U-853 was sent to harass United States coastal shipping. She destroyed  near Portland, Maine. Just days before Germany's surrender, U-853 torpedoed and sank the collier Black Point during the Battle of Point Judith.

U-853 is a popular deep sea diving site.

Design
German Type IXC/40 submarines were slightly larger than the original Type IXCs. U-853 had a displacement of  when at the surface and  while submerged. She had two shafts and two  propellers.

U-853 was fitted with six  torpedo tubes (four fitted at the bow and two at the stern), 22 torpedoes, one  SK C/32 naval gun, 180 rounds, and a  SK C/30 as well as a  C/30 anti-aircraft gun. The boat had a complement of forty-eight.

Armament

FLAK weaponry
U-853 was armed with a single 3.7 cm Flakzwilling M43U gun on the LM 42U mount. The LM 42U mount was the most common mount used with the 3.7 cm Flak M42U. The 3.7 cm Flak M42U was the marine version of the 3.7 cm Flak used by the Kriegsmarine on Type VII and Type IX U-boats. U-853 had two 2cm Flak C38 in a M 43U Zwilling mount with short folding shield mounted on the upper Wintergarten. The M 43U mount was used on a number of U-boats (and ).

Service history
U-853 was built by DeSchiMAG AG Weser of Bremen. Ordered on 5 June 1941, her keel was laid on 21 August 1942 and she was commissioned on 25 June 1943.

The Germans nicknamed the U-boat der Seiltänzer ("the Tightrope Walker"), and her crew painted an emblem of a yellow shield with a red horse on her sail.

First patrol
On her first war patrol from May to June 1944, U-853 was assigned to weather-watching duty under the command of Kapitänleutnant Helmut Sommer. German intelligence believed that weather conditions in the Atlantic could be used to help predict the timing of an Allied invasion of Europe. On 25 May 1944 U-853 spotted , loaded with American troops and supplies. The U-boat submerged to attack, but was outrun by the much larger and faster ship. The U-boat took no significant damage and returned fire, hitting all three aircraft. The planes were able to return to their carrier, but after recovery one was deemed a total loss and jettisoned.

Intercepted radio transmissions led Croatan and six destroyers to search for U-853. The U-853 proved so elusive that Croatan's crew nicknamed their prey "Moby Dick." Within minutes two FM-1 Wildcat fighters strafed the submarine, killing 2 men and wounding 12 others. Sommer suffered 28 shrapnel and bullet wounds yet still managed to give the order to submerge. In all likelihood Sommer saved his submarine from being destroyed by allied bombers.

Three weeks of pursuit from 25 May until 17 June placed an enormous strain on U-853s crew. Twenty-three-year-old Oberleutnant zur See Helmut Frömsdorf took command of the boat on 18 June (his first command) and returned to Lorient in northwest France. Sommer and a large number of the crew was declared unfit for duty. On 10 July Sommer was formally relieved by Oberleutnant zur See Otto Wermuth.

Second patrol
The boat remained in port until 27 August. Decorated veteran Korvettenkapitän Günter Kuhnke, Commander of the 10th U-boat Flotilla, took command for her second patrol.
U-853 operated this time in the Western Approaches off the British Isles, but in a period of seven weeks scored no successes. On completion she did not return to Lorient, but continued to Flensburg, Germany, arriving 14 October.
Kuhnke assumed command of the 33rd U-boat Flotilla upon arriving at Flensburg. He relinquished command of U-853 back to Frömsdorf, who took the U-boat on her third and final patrol. Before departure U-853 was fitted with a Schnorchel, a retractable air intake and exhaust that allowed the ship to remain submerged while running her diesel engines. The Schnorchel reduced the need to spend dangerous periods on the surface recharging batteries.

Last patrol
On 23 February 1945 Germany sent U-853 on her third war patrol to harass US coastal shipping. Under the command of Oberleutnant zur See Helmut Frömsdorf, U-853 did not sink any targets during the first weeks of her patrol. Her crossing of the Atlantic was slow because she used her Schnorchel to remain submerged to avoid being spotted by Allied aircraft. On 1 April 1945 U-853 was ordered to the Gulf of Maine.

On 23 April she fatally torpedoed  near Portland, Maine.
Only 13 of the 67 crew survived. That same day  dropped nine depth charges on a suspected submarine. The next day  made sonar contact and attacked U-853, but failed to destroy her.

Although several survivors claimed to have seen a submarine sail with yellow and red insignia, a Navy inquiry attributed the PE-56 sinking to a boiler explosion. The Navy reversed its findings in 2001 to acknowledge that the sinking was due to hostile fire and awarded Purple Hearts to the survivors and next-of-kin of the deceased.

Battle of Point Judith

On 5 May 1945, Reichspräsident of Nazi Germany Karl Dönitz ordered all U-boats to cease offensive operations and return to their bases. U-853 was lying in wait off Point Judith, Rhode Island at the time. According to the US Coast Guard, U-853 either did not receive that order or, less likely, ignored it. Soon after, her torpedo blew off the stern of Black Point, a  collier underway from New York to Boston. She was the last US-flagged merchant ship lost in World War II. Twelve men died and 34 crew members were rescued. One of the rescuing ships, Yugoslav freighter Kamen, sent a report of the torpedoing to authorities.

At first, the U-boat attempted to flee, then tried to hide by lying still. Both times it was found by sonar. On the morning of 6 May 1945 two K-Class blimps from Lakehurst, New Jersey, K-16 and K-58, joined the attack, locating oil slicks and marking suspected locations with smoke and dye markers. K-16 also attacked with 7.2-inch rocket bombs. Numerous depth charge and hedgehog attacks from Atherton and Moberly resulted in planking, life rafts, a chart tabletop, clothing, and an officer's cap floating to the surface. U-853 was one of the last U-boats sunk during World War II and the last to be sunk in US waters. ( was sunk the same day in the North Atlantic.) Atherton and Moberly received joint credit for the kill.

Legacy
The body of one of U-853s crewmembers was recovered in 1960 and was interred in the Island Cemetery Annex on Van Zandt Avenue in Newport, Rhode Island. The submarine's two propellers were on display for many years at the Inn at Castle Hill in Newport and are now in the custody of the United States Naval War College Museum at the Newport Naval Station.

The USS Atherton was transferred to Japan and served as part of the Japanese Maritime Self Defense Force until 1975 when she was returned to the United States. She was given to the Philippines in 1978 and served as BRP Rajah Humabon (PS-11) with the Philippine Navy until 2018.

Interest has been expressed in returning Atherton to the United States so she can be restored to her World War II appearance and be opened to the public. Rajah Humabon was decommissioned on 15 March 2018 and is planned to be part of the Philippine Navy museum in Sangley Point.

Wreck
Most of the 55 crew member bodies remain within the hull, which is a war grave. It is one of the more popular dive sites in Southern New England. The hull has depth charge blast holes: one forward of the conning tower at the radio room and another in the starboard side of the engine room. Entering the wreck is dangerous due to debris, sharp metal edges, and confined spaces.

On 6 and 7 May 1945, Navy divers attempted to enter the wreck to recover the captain's safe and the papers within, but failed. Recreational divers first visited the site in 1953. In 1960 a recreational diver brought up a body from the wreck. This provoked former navy admirals and clergy to petition the US government for restrictions on disturbing the dead. The German crewman was buried with full military honors in Newport, Rhode Island.

As of 1998 at least two recreational divers have died from exploring the wreckage. Stephen Hardick died in 2005 while filming the U-boat. He surfaced unconscious and could not be revived. Hardick, age 60, died as the result of saltwater drowning associated with poor health according to the Rhode Island Medical Examiner's office.

On October 26th of 2022 a live depth charge was found near the wreckage by fishermen based out of Rhode Island. The depth charge contained 267 pounds of TNT which was set out to destroy the German U-boat.

Summary of raiding history

References

Notes

Citations

Bibliography

External links
 US Coast Guard history of U-853
 The Battle of Point Judith – A detailed and well referenced account of the battle.

German Type IX submarines
World War II submarines of Germany
Shipwrecks of the Rhode Island coast
New Shoreham, Rhode Island
U-boats commissioned in 1943
U-boats sunk in 1945
U-boats sunk by depth charges
U-boats sunk by US warships
World War II shipwrecks in the Atlantic Ocean
1943 ships
Ships built in Bremen (state)
Ships lost with all hands
Maritime incidents in May 1945